Mongonui may refer to:

Mangōnui, New Zealand settlement in Northland which used to be called Mongonui
Mongonui (New Zealand electorate), the electoral district under that name
Newstead railway station, a former railway station previously named Mongonui in Waikato, New Zealand

See also
Mangonui County, formerly known as Mongonui County
Mongonui and Bay of Islands (New Zealand electorate), another electoral district using the name